Sultan Abdul Aziz Shah Airport, (formerly Subang International Airport/Kuala Lumpur International Airport), often called Subang Airport or Subang Skypark,  is an airport located in Subang, Petaling District, Selangor, Malaysia.

Subang International Airport served as Kuala Lumpur's main airport from 1965 to 1998, before the Kuala Lumpur International Airport in Sepang was opened. Although plans existed to convert the airport into a low-cost carrier base, the change was opposed by Subang Jaya residents. The airport was repurposed to serve general aviation as well as turboprop domestic and international flights. In 1996, the airport was renamed after Sultan Salahuddin Abdul Aziz Shah Al-Haj (Salahuddin of Selangor), the eleventh Yang di-Pertuan Agong of Malaysia and eighth Sultan of Selangor.

Subang Airport is currently the base for SKS Airways, Firefly and Batik Air Malaysia commercial turboprop services. Raya Airways is the only other non-passenger non-turbo prop aircraft landing and utilising Subang Airport Terminal 2. While heavily opposed by Ara Damansara residents of the noise of the jet engines, Raya Airways still operates out of SZB servicing DHL and other local hubs.

History 

Work on the Subang International Airport started in 1961 and finished in 1965 at a cost of $64 million. Its deceptively simple design consisted of a roof composed of floating concrete shells that was held aloft by mushroom-shaped columns. Partners in the Booty Edwards Architectural practice Kington Loo and C.H.R Bailey are typically attributed with the design. The open structure also featured a massive circular ramp, reminiscent of Berthold Lubetkin's penguin pavilion in London. Most of the structure was removed during a major reconstruction in 1983.

The airport was officially opened to traffic on 30 August 1965, and had the longest runway (3.7 km long, 45m wide – runway 15 – 33) in Southeast Asia, replacing Sungai Besi Airport. By the 1990s, the airport had three terminals – Terminal 1 for international flights, Terminal 2 for Singapore – Kuala Lumpur shuttle flights by Singapore Airlines and Malaysia Airlines, and Terminal 3 for domestic flights. Toward the end of service, the airport suffered at least two major fires that forced traffic to be diverted to other airports. By the end of 1997, Subang Airport had handled 15.8 million passengers.  In 2003 terminal 1 was demolished.

In July 2002, AirAsia began flying from KLIA, and in 2004, AirAsia considered utilising the airport as a primary hub in Malaysia. However, the plan was rejected and the Malaysian government planned to turn the airport into an international conference centre. Since Firefly started operations in the airport, AirAsia has been lobbying the government to allow AirAsia to use Subang Airport. As of December 2007, the government still maintains its policy of only allowing general aviation and turbo-prop flights out of Subang Airport.
The airport underwent renovation works at Terminal 3 from February 2008 and was finished in October 2009. Terminal 3 was renamed to Subang Skypark.

Present
Raya Airways, a national cargo carrier, chose Subang Airport as its main cargo operation center. Several companies offer chartered flights and helicopter services from the airport. One of the largest FBO (Fixed-Base Operator) in the region (with covered hangar space of more than 100,000 sqft), Dnest Aviation Services is also based in this airport. Their newest hangar boast a "first of its kind" infrastructure capable of taking in either a 737 BBJ or A319 ACJ and 2 basement floors directly underneath it with ample of office space, lecture rooms, carpark and a cafeteria. A number of flying clubs are also located at Sultan Abdul Aziz Shah airport, the most famous of these being Subang Flying Club, Air Adventure Flying Club, Eurocopter (An EADS Company), ESB Flying Club(Eurodynamic Sdn Bhd). With Eurocopter, the airport serves as a maintenance and support facility for Malaysian Maritime Enforcement Agency helicopters.

Berjaya Air's head office is in the Berjaya Hangar in the SkyPark Terminal Building. Previously the head office was in Terminal 3. Transmile Air Services has its head office in the Transmile Centre in the Cargo Complex. The main headquarters of Malaysia Airlines was previously in Subang, consisting of administrative departments & its maintenance, repair and overhaul subsidiary, MAS Aerospace. In addition, another MAS subsidiary, Firefly also operates a fleet of ATR 72 out of Subang.

Apart from that, Sultan Abdul Aziz Shah Airport was to be a hub for Global Flying Hospitals, but the humanitarian medical charity made the decision to close down Malaysian Operations, stating that the elements to make the correct formula for the GFH model were not present.

Skypark Terminal 3 transformation plan
On 4 December 2007, Subang SkyPark Sdn Bhd announce a RM 300 million plan to transform the Terminal 3 building into an ultra-modern general and corporate aviation hub. The plan includes upgrading the terminal, creation of regional aviation center and finally the establishment of a commercial nexus. Under an agreement with Malaysia Airports, Subang Skypark will serve private aviation while Malaysia Airports will serve Berjaya Air and Firefly Airlines. Subang Skypark recently signed a lease agreement with Malaysia Airports for the land in the Airport in Langkawi.
On the next day, VistaJet, a business jet service provider, has announced that it will use the airport as a base of operations in Malaysia. It has chosen Terminal 3, which is being operated by Subang Skypark to be the hub in Asia.

The construction works was awarded to ArcRadius Sdn Bhd. It is expected that the lounge works will be done by end of March 2008. The transformation plans also calls for a construction of two 42 meters by 47 meters maintenance, repair and overhaul hangars and ten 36-meter by 36-meter parking hangars. The construction of the MRO hangars will complete by end of 2008 while two of the ten parking hangars will complete by end of 2009.

On 8 August 2008, VistaJet Holding SA started operations from the airport. It provides private jet travel from Malaysia to anywhere in the world.

Subang Airport underwent a RM40 million facelift on the check-in terminals. The facelift did nothing much to address the lack of parking spots, although a valet service is provided. Parking cost RM25 on daily basis. A rail link was added in 2018 to connect to the airport to Kuala Lumpur Sentral via KTM Komuter; travellers can also catch a local bus out of Central Market bus hub.

The airport was officiated by Prime Minister Datuk Seri Najib Tun Razak on 28 October 2009. The Prime Minister has expressed confidence that the airport will reach 2 million annual passenger and emerge as a regional hub of ASEAN.

Terminal 2 at Skypark Subang

The next phase of development will entail the refurbishment of the former Terminal 2 (T2) of the SAAS airport into an extension of the SkyPark Terminal 3. Works are scheduled to commence end of 2017 with an estimated construction period of 24 months. The combined capacity of T2 and T3 will be 5 million passengers.

With a retail extension of 320,000 sq ft, the project will include airport facilities and services and a multilevel car park of 350,000 sq ft with 1,155 bays.  The extension will also include an entertainment / event deck that overlooks the runway, a first of its kind, open to public, in Malaysia.

Commercial Nexus
Skypark Commercial Nexus is a mixed development commercial project sited on a  plot adjoined to the main terminal. Among the proposed highlights of the Nexus would be a hotel, entertainment outlets, aviation museum and an aviation theme park (subject to approval from authority). A multi-storey car park is also included. Construction work is expected to commence in early 2014.  The upcoming railway line is planned to connect SkyPark Nexus to Subang Jaya KTMB station.

Airlines and destinations

Passenger

Cargo

Traffic and statistics

Ground transportation

Airport taxi
There is a taxi booth inside the terminal building, so arriving passengers can directly go to the booth and get on a taxi.

Bus

Transit bus
Buses from Subang Skypark towards Pasar Seni (Central Market) in Kuala Lumpur city center are Rapid KL bus No. 772 (also stops at Asia Jaya LRT station and KL Sentral).  The bus ticket costs RM2.50 (Asia Jaya) & RM3.00 (Pasar Seni), and the route operates from 6:00 am till midnight.

Feeder bus
To serve the newly opened Kelana Jaya extension line and MRT Kajang Line, there is a Rapid KL feeder bus No. T773 route between Ara Damansara LRT Station and Subang Skypark and MRT feeder bus No. T804 route between Kwasa Sentral station and Subang Airport. Fares are fixed at RM1.00.

Airport shuttle bus
There is also a bus shuttle service between Subang Skypark and Kuala Lumpur International Airport KLIA & KLIA2.  The service departs from Subang Skypark from 5am until 7pm.  The one-way journey takes around one hour (subject to traffic) and costs RM10 per passenger.

Airport train

A KTM Komuter shuttle service connecting KL Sentral through Subang Jaya to the terminal has been in operation since 1 May 2018. This extension is a branch line of the Port Klang Line and provides rail connectivity to the airport that is currently only served by other kinds of road transportation.

Accidents and incidents
11 May 1976 – British Airways Flight 888, a Boeing 747-100 from London to Melbourne via Bahrain, Bangkok and Kuala Lumpur, was on approach to Runway 15 when it flew below the normal flight path, hitting trees 2.2 nautical miles before the runway threshold. On landing, inspection of the aircraft revealed damage on the main landing gear; strike marks on the fuselage and engine intakes; and evidence of debris ingestion on the two left-side engines.
27 September 1977 – Japan Airlines Flight 715, a Douglas DC-8, crashed into a hill in bad weather while attempting to land on Runway 15. 34 people, including 8 of the 10 crew members and 26 of the 69 passengers, were killed when the aircraft broke on impact.
 18 December 1983 – Malaysian Airline System Flight 684, an Airbus A300 from Singapore crashed 2 km short of the runway while approaching Runway 15 in bad weather. There were no fatalities, but the aircraft was written off. Ironically, the aircraft was operating its last scheduled flight for Malaysian Airline System, before being returned to its original operator, Scandinavian Airlines System.
 19 February 1989 – Flying Tiger Line Flight 66, a Boeing 747-200F from Singapore crashed 12 kilometres from the airport while on approach to Runway 33. The pilots misinterpreted the controller's instructions to descend, causing the aircraft to fly below minimum altitude and crash into a hillside on the outskirts of Puchong. All four flight crew were killed.
 18 March 2019 – At approximately 3.20am, an accident had happened on the runway of Sultan Abdul Aziz Shah Airport Subang involving a privately owned Bombardier Challenger 300 and an airport engineering vehicle. The vehicle was on the runway to escort contractors fixing the lighting of the runway when the airport staff driving it fell asleep while waiting for the contractors to finish their work. The contractors vacated the runway upon seeing the landing lights of the approaching aircraft while the airport staff in the vehicle had died from the incident a few days later. Two air traffic controllers were suspended due to the incident.  
 24 March 2021 - At 9.25am, an Airbus AS350 B3 helicopter crashed at the airport. There were five people on board, including one pilot and four passengers. All the victims were taken to the hospital for further treatment, two persons were reportedly injured and one suffered a broken leg and head injury. It left Sungai Lembing in Pahang at 8.30am and was on a private flight to Subang via Maran, Temerloh, Karak and the Batu Caves. A safety investigation will be conducted by Malaysia's Air Accident Investigation Bureau.

Other shared facilities

  AIROD is located north of the passenger terminal and occupies the land there.
  RMAF Subang Air Base, is located on the western side of the runway, shared with the MMEA hangar
  Various hangars storing corporate jets are located south of the Passenger Terminal
  The cargo terminal, the base of Raya Air is actually located across the main road, featuring a taxiway crossing the road. Airbus Helicopters has an office at that same location.
  The Police Air Unit base for Peninsular Malaysia is located at the extreme south of the airfield, the latest addition after shifting there from Sungai Besi Air Base in 2018.

References

External links

Skypark Terminal Sultan Abdul Aziz Shah Airport at Malaysia Airports Holdings Berhad

Airports in Selangor
Airports established in 1965
1965 establishments in Malaysia
Transport in the Klang Valley
Buildings and structures in Selangor
Petaling District